West Bay is a Canadian rural community located in Cumberland County, Nova Scotia.

It is situated on the north shore of the Minas Basin, west of Partridge Island, adjacent to the town of Parrsboro.

Communities in Cumberland County, Nova Scotia